I'm a Stripper is a 5 part TV documentary mini-series written and directed by Charlie David, and produced by Nickolaos Stagias with David's own Border2Border Entertainment Inc. The show follows the lives of a number of male strippers from various backgrounds in a number of locations in United States and Canada. The full title I'm a Stripper: The Real Life Magic Men refers to the popularity of Steven Soderbergh's film Magic Mike starring Channing Tatum.

The series was launched on 3 April 2013 for television and has been featured in American Logo for its 'WHAT!?' documentary series features and on Canadian OUTtv specialized stations.

Synopsis
The series features a group of friend strippers in Niagara Falls region, a young Asian man stripping in Montreal, and the performers in a Las Vegas show called Thunder from Down Under. The strippers talk about money, sexual turn-on, rivalry on stage, creativity, differences between male and female spectators, personal lives, a typical day on the club floor and away from it, reactions of families and friends.

A number of entertainment experts and psychologists offer their opinions about the profession including Morris Chapdelaine, Scott Bolton and Laurie Betito.

Cast
A number of strippers are featured. The main characters are:
Alexander Biffin
Blake McIver Ewing
Brendan Coates
Brent Everett
Brent Ray Fraser
Clint Scott
Gabriel Clark
Jeremy Smith
Joshua Barilko
Laurie Betito
Morris Chapdelaine
Scott Bolton
Shazad Hai
Steve Pena
Suntory Awiskar

Episodes

Episode 1 
Follows 3 male strippers from the North American cities of Montreal, Niagara Falls and Las Vegas. From a group of friends trying to make a living in Niagara, to an Asian man fighting conservative stereotypes, to Las Vegas, the city of sin. The documentary gives an in depth look into the industry and offers a unique view on how society has accepted male strippers, the dangers of stripping, expectations and why men would want to become strippers.

Episode 2 
Follows Gabriel's life as a stripper in an open relationship with his fiancé and reveals his dad, Lucas' secrets. Meanwhile, Bronco keeps up with having 3 part-time jobs while stripping and faces criticism as his 30th birthday approaches.

Episode 3 
Follows Canada's first all male burlesque group in the city of Toronto. The group consists of diverse men from various ethnicities and sexualities.

Episode 4 
Follows male strippers from the Bronx, Baltimore and Jamaica. Features a male Go-Go dancing troupe and explores the similarities and differences between Go-Go dancing and stripping. Meanwhile, Shazad, who struggled with his weight and body image for years is now a Muslim bodybuilding stripper.

Episode 5 
Explores the new and risky business of online stripping, with video streaming and enormous credit card tips, and without many rules.

References

External links

I'm a Stripper on Vimeo

2010s Canadian television miniseries
2013 Canadian television series debuts
2013 Canadian television series endings
OutTV (Canadian TV channel) original programming
2010s Canadian documentary television series
2010s Canadian LGBT-related television series
Canadian LGBT-related reality television series